A dielectric gas, or insulating gas, is a dielectric material in gaseous state. Its main purpose is to prevent or rapidly quench electric discharges. Dielectric gases are used as electrical insulators in high voltage applications, e.g. transformers, circuit breakers (namely sulfur hexafluoride circuit breakers), switchgear (namely high voltage switchgear), radar waveguides, etc.

For high voltage applications, a good dielectric gas should have high dielectric strength, high thermal stability and chemical inertness against the construction materials used, non-flammability and low toxicity, low boiling point, good heat transfer properties, and low cost.

The most common dielectric gas is air, due to its ubiquity and low cost. Another commonly used gas is a dry nitrogen.

In special cases, e.g., high voltage switches, gases with good dielectric properties and very high breakdown voltages are needed. Highly electronegative elements, e.g., halogens, are favored as they rapidly recombine with the ions present in the discharge channel. The halogen gases are highly corrosive. Other compounds, which dissociate only in the discharge pathway, are therefore preferred; sulfur hexafluoride, organofluorides (especially perfluorocarbons) and chlorofluorocarbons are the most common.

The breakdown voltage of gases is roughly proportional to their density. Breakdown voltages also increase with the gas pressure. Many gases have limited upper pressure due to their liquefaction.

The decomposition products of halogenated compounds are highly corrosive, hence the occurrence of corona discharge should be prevented.

Build-up of moisture can degrade dielectric properties of the gas. Moisture analysis is used for early detection of this.

Dielectric gases can also serve as coolants.

Vacuum is an alternative for gas in some applications.

Mixtures of gases can be used where appropriate. Addition of sulfur hexafluoride can dramatically improve the dielectric properties of poorer insulators, e.g. helium or nitrogen. Multicomponent gas mixtures can offer superior dielectric properties; the optimum mixtures combine the electron attaching gases (sulfur hexafluoride, octafluorocyclobutane) with molecules capable of thermalizing (slowing) accelerated electrons (e.g. tetrafluoromethane, fluoroform). The insulator properties of the gas are controlled by the combination of electron attachment, electron scattering, and electron ionization.

Atmospheric pressure significantly influences the insulation properties of air. High-voltage applications, e.g. xenon flash lamps, can experience electrical breakdowns at high altitudes.

* The density is approximate; it is normally specified at atmospheric pressure, the temperature may vary, though it is mostly 0 °C.

References

 
Electric power systems components
Electric power distribution